Roselea Arbana "Rose" Maddox (August 15, 1925 – April 15, 1998) was an American country singer-songwriter and fiddle player, who was the lead singer with the Maddox Brothers and Rose before a successful solo career.  Her musical styles blended hillbilly music, rockabilly and gospel. She was noted for her "reputation as a lusty firebrand", and her "colorful Western costumes"; she was one of the earliest clients of Hollywood tailor, Nathan Turk.

Biography
She was born in Boaz, Alabama, and traveled west at the age of seven with her family, who had been sharecroppers.  She later said in an interview:

Cotton prices failed in Alabama. So we left for California, the Land of Milk and Honey... We only had $35 when we left there, and a dream of going to California.  That was my mother's dream. Hitchhikin'. All of us. Five kids.... The brakemen helped us get on the right trains and they got us food from the caboose. Sometimes the brakemen locked us in the boxcars and told us to be quiet....  We got to Los Angeles, California, in 1933. The Salvation Army heard there was a family coming. They didn't have enough room there, so Dad and Cal slept in jail. At least it was a place to stay. We went from L.A. up to Oakland on the freights. We lived in Pipe City. There were these huge culvert pipes and all the migrants were living inside culverts. The mayor of Pipe City gave us his pipe to stay in. My mother got tired of asking for food every day. That's when we hit the front page of the Oakland Tribune as a family come west on the freights looking for work.

After her father eventually found work, the family ended up in Modesto, California. Rose first performed with her brothers in amateur shows at the age of 11, and while in her teens began performing with them on local radio station KTRB. The station offered her brothers a regular slot on condition that Rose sing with them, despite the opposition of their mother, who managed the group. After the brothers had served in World War II, Rose first recorded with them, for Four Star Records, in 1947. The group began to be successful in the late 1940s, and she and her brothers moved to live in Hollywood.  They toured widely, and appeared regularly on the Louisiana Hayride radio show. Rose became noted for her colorful performances, once shocking a Grand Ole Opry audience by appearing with a bare midriff. She also recorded as a duo, Rosie and Retta, with her sister-in-law. Her first marriage was to E.B. Hale during the Second World War, when she was 16. She married club owner Jim Brogdon in the late 1950s; they separated after six years.

After the Maddox Brothers group broke up in 1957, Rose initially performed with her brother Cal and then started a solo career. She had 14 hits on the Billboard country singles chart between 1959 and 1964, including several duets with Buck Owens, and also recorded with Bill Monroe. Her biggest hit, "Sing a Little Song of Heartache," reached no.3 on the country chart at the end of 1962. She then began to specialize in bluegrass recordings, recording the commercially successful and influential album Rose Maddox Sings Bluegrass for Capitol Records.  After her contract with the company ended in 1965, she began to concentrate on tours, performing with her brothers Cal and Henry and son Donnie – who died in 1982 – in the UK, Europe and elsewhere. She also performed regularly with bluegrass musician Vern Williams.

She suffered several heart attacks from the late 1960s onwards, but continued to perform and record, for several labels. In 1996, she was nominated for a Grammy award for her Arhoolie bluegrass album, $35 and a Dream.  Her final album was The Moon Is Rising, also in 1996.

Maddox also acted in movies including The Hi-Lo Country (1998), and the documentaries The Women of Country (1993) and Woody Guthrie: Hard Travelin' (1984).

In later years she lived in Ashland, Oregon, near where her brother Don Maddox had bought a ranch in 1958.  She died in Ashland of kidney failure in 1998, at the age of 72.

Legacy
Emmylou Harris believes Maddox has never received the recognition she deserves, in part because of what Harris calls a reluctance in American society to celebrate the value of white country and roots music. Dolly Parton also credits Maddox as an early influence. Laura Cantrell's song "California Rose" was written in memory of Maddox.

Her life story and that of the band were told in the biography, Ramblin' Rose: The Life and Career of Rose Maddox by Jonny Whiteside.  The book won an award for excellence in 1998 from the Association for Recorded Sound Collections (ARSC).

Discography

Albums
Maddox Brothers and Rose
 A Collection of Standard Sacred Songs (King, 1959)
 Maddox Bros. and Rose (King, 1960)
 I'll Write Your Name in the Sand (King, 1961) 
 Maddox Brothers and Rose (Wrangler, 1962)
 Go Honky Tonkin! (Hilltop, 1965)
 America's Most Colorful Hillbilly Band, v.1 (Arhoolie, 1976 [LP]; 1993 [CD])
 America's Most Colorful Hillbilly Band, v.2 (Arhoolie, 1976 [LP]; 1995 [CD])
 Old Pals of Yesterday (Picc-A-Dilly, 1980) 
 On the Air, v.1 (Arhoolie, 1983 [LP]; 1996 [CD])
 Maddox Bros. and Rose: Columbia Historic Edition (Columbia, 1984)
 On the Air, v.2 (Arhoolie, 1985 [LP]; 1996 [CD])
 Live – On the Radio (Arhoolie, 1996) recorded 1953
 The Hillbilly Boogie Years (Rockateer, 1996) all Columbia recordings
 The Most Colorful Hillbilly Band in America (Bear Family, 1998) 4-CD set
 A Proper Introduction to Maddox Brothers & Rose: That'll Learn Ya Durn Ya (Proper, 2004)

Solo/Compilations
Precious Memories (Columbia, 1958)
The One Rose (Capitol, 1960)
Glorybound Train (Capitol, 1961)
A Big Bouquet of Roses (Capitol, 1961)
Rose Maddox Sings Bluegrass (Capitol, 1962 [LP]; 1996 [CD])
Alone with You (Capitol, 1963)
Rosie (Starday, 1970)
Reckless Love & Bold Adventure (Takoma, 1977)
Rose of the West Coast Country (Arhoolie, 1980)
This is Rose Maddox (Arhoolie, 1982)
A Beautiful Bouquet (Arhoolie, 1983)
Queen of the West (Varrick, 1984)  (with The Strangers)
California Rose (See for Miles, 1989)
$35 and a Dream (Arhoolie, 1994)
The One Rose: The Capitol Years (Bear Family, 1994) 4-CD set
The Moon is Rising (Country Town Music, 1996)
The Legendary Queen of the West (Boothill, 2000)

Chart singles

Notes

References

External links
 New York Times obituary

Fan site with biographies, discographies, etc.
 "Remembering Rose Maddox", Country Standard Time Editorial, May 1998
Biography of the Maddox Brothers and Rose at www.cowgirls.com

1925 births
1998 deaths
People from Boaz, Alabama
American country singer-songwriters
American women country singers
Western swing performers
Grand Ole Opry members
Musicians from Ashland, Oregon
Western swing fiddlers
Four Star Records artists
Starday Records artists
20th-century American violinists
20th-century American singers
Writers from Ashland, Oregon
Women violinists
Singer-songwriters from Oregon
20th-century American women singers
Country musicians from Alabama
Arhoolie Records artists
Singer-songwriters from Alabama